William Sage III (born April 3, 1962) is an American actor and alumnus of State University of New York at Purchase.  He is known for his collaborations with director Hal Hartley. Sage has appeared in more than 80 movies, most notable American Psycho (2000), We Are What We Are (2013), Every Secret Thing (2014), and Wrong Turn (2021). On television, he appeared on Nurse Jackie, Hap and Leonard and Power.

Filmography
 1992 Simple Men as Dennis McCabe
 1995 Flirt as Bill
 1995 The Perez Family as Steve Steverino
 1996 I Shot Andy Warhol as Tom Baker
 1998 High Art as Arnie
 1998 Sex and the City as Kurt Harrington
 1998 Somewhere in the City as Justin
 1999 The Insider as Intense Young Intern
 2000 Boiler Room as FBI Agent David Drew 
 2000 American Psycho as David Van Patten
 2001 Glitter as Billie's Father
 2002 No Such Thing as Carlo
 2002 Evenhand as Officer Ted Morning
 2003 Sin as Detective Cal Brody
 2004 Mysterious Skin as Coach
 2005 The Girl from Monday as Jack Bell
 2006 The Handyman as Caleb Tucker
 2006 Heavens Fall as Thomas Knight Jr.
 2007 Fast Company as Robert
 2007 If I Didn't Care as Davis Myers
 2008 Tennessee as Roy
 2009 Precious as Mr. Wicher
 2010 The Scientist
 2010 Off Season as The Man (short film)
 2010 Boy Wonder
 2010-2011 Nurse Jackie (TV series) as Bill / Seizure Man
 2011 Boardwalk Empire (TV series) as Solomon Bishop / George Bishop 
 2012 Electrick Children as Tim
 2012 Person of Interest as Reddy (Episode: "The Contingency")
 2012 Surviving Family as Jerry Malone
 2013 We Are What We Are as Frank Parker
 2014 Every Secret Thing as Dave Fuller
 2014 The Taking of Ezra Bodine as Dean
 2015 The Boy as Sheriff
 2015 Grass Stains
 2016 Hap and Leonard (TV series) as Howard
 2016  Fender Bender as The Driver
 2016 AWOL as Roy
 2017 The Price as John Kocher
 2017 Welcome to Willits as Brock
 2018 After Everything as Paul
 2017-2018 Power as Sammy
 2020 The Pale Door as Dodd
 2021 Wrong Turn as Venable / Ram Skull

References

External links
 
Bill Sage Interview: Wrong Turn

1962 births
Living people
American male film actors
American male television actors
Male actors from New York City
State University of New York at Purchase alumni